Veternica is a cave located on the Medvednica mountain, north of Zagreb, Croatia. It is an archeological site where remains of several kinds of prehistoric animals as well as humans have been found. The cave has been protected by law since 1979.

References

Caves of Croatia